Ríos Rosas is a neighborhood of Madrid belonging to the district of Chamberí.
It takes its name from Antonio de los Ríos Rosas, a 19th-century politician.

The ward is served by the Madrid Metro station called Ríos Rosas, one of the first stations to be opened on the network.

The ward has recently filled up with cosy modern pubs and restaurants, especially in Ponzano Street.

References

Wards of Madrid
Chamberí